The Moye Boarding House is a historic building in Portland, Tennessee. It was built in 1878–1892 for A.C. Butt or Kate Moye on land formerly owned by Thomas Buntin. It was a boarding house on the Louisville & Nashville Railroad from 1890 to 1945. It was acquired by the city of Portland in 2011, and it received $15,000 from the Tennessee Historical Commission and the Historic Preservation Fund to be restored in 2016. The building was designed in the Folk Victorian architectural style. It has been listed on the National Register of Historic Places since March 27, 2013.

References

National Register of Historic Places in Sumner County, Tennessee
Houses completed in 1878